Myeongil-dong is a dong, neighbourhood of Gangdong-gu in Seoul, South Korea.

History 
The name of Myeongil was named after 'Myeongil-won' during Goryeo Dynasty in the 10th century. Myeongil-won was an accommodation facilities and duty station of renting or transferring horses for the Public officials who go a business trip. In modern times, Myeongil-dong was actually a part of Myeongil-ri, Gucheon-myeon, Gwangju, Gyeonggi-do Province, and then be included into Seoul in 1963. Even nowadays, the street of Gucheonmyeon-gil still exists. From the late 1970s to mid-1980s, large scale of falm and orchard were renovated into huge apartments complex built by Korea National Housing Corporation (currently Korea Land & Housing Corporation), Samick, Woosung, Hanyang and Hyundai Engineering and Construction and developed as one of new town in Seoul, along with Mok-dong and Sanggye-dong in the 1990s. In 1995, Seoul Subway Line 5 was passed through this area stopping at Godeok Station, Myeongil Station and Gubeundari Station. Currently, Myeongil-dong is well known for the location of Myungsung Presbyterian Church, E-mart Myeongil branch, Home plus Gangdong branch and neighborhood of Hanyoung Foreign Language High School.

Area information 
The new 5-digit postal code for Myeongil-dong is 05257.

The 6-digit postal code, used until 2015, was 134-070. 134 is for Gangdong-gu and 070 is for Myeongil-dong.

See also 
Administrative divisions of Gangdong-gu
Administrative divisions of Seoul
Administrative divisions of South Korea

References

External links
Gangdong-gu official website
 Gangdong-gu map
 The Myeongil 1 dong Resident office

Neighbourhoods of Gangdong District